Saddam Hussain may refer to:
 Saddam Hussein (1937–2006), Iraqi president and dictator
 Saddam Hussain (athlete) (born 1991), Pakistani runner, who was reported missing in 2014 and came back to competitions since 2017
 Saddam Hussain (footballer) (born 1993), Pakistani football player
 Saddam Hossain (cricketer, born 1994), Bangladeshi cricketer
 Saddam Hossain (cricketer, born 1995), Bangladeshi cricketer